Lilov is a Bulgarian masculine surname, its feminine counterpart is Lilova. Notable people with the surname include:

Aleksandar Lilov (1933–2013), Bulgarian politician and philosopher
Boris Lilov, Soviet equestrian
Ivan Lilov (born 1988), Bulgarian basketball player

Bulgarian-language surnames